Chettathirat or (upon accession to the Ayutthayan throne) Ramathibodi II (1472/73 – July/10 October 1529) was the King of Sukhothai from 1485 and King of Ayutthaya from 1491 to 1529. His reign was marked by the first Western Contact with the Portuguese.

King of Sukhothai
Prince Chettathirat was the youngest of Trailokanat's three sons. His eldest brother, Prince Borommaracha, was appointed the regent of Ayutthaya during his father's campaigns against Lanna kingdom. His other brother, Prince Indraracha, died during the wars with Lanna. In 1485, Prince Chettathirat was appointed the Uparaja, or Crown Prince, and was crowned as the King of Sukhothai (The title King of Sukhothai was the title of Ayutthayan Crown Prince.)

In 1488, Trailokanat died. Though Chettathirat was the Crown Prince, the Ayutthayan throne was inherited by his brother Prince Borommaracha, as Borommaracha III. In 1491, Borommaracha III died, leaving the throne to Chettathirat, thus reuniting the two kingdoms.

King of Ayutthaya
Chettathiraj took the reigning name in Ayutthaya as Ramathibodi II.

Invasion of Malacca
In 1500, Ramathibodi II sent the Siamese armies to subjugate the Sultanate of Malacca. Though unable to conquer Malacca, Siam managed to exact tributes from the Malacca sultanate and other sultanates like Pattani, Pahang, and Kelantan.

In 1511, however, Malacca fell to the Portuguese under Afonso de Albuquerque. Albuquerque's embassy, under the leadership of Duarte Fernandes, arrived in Siam in 1518.  These were the first Europeans in Siam. Rama Tibodi II signed a treaty with them giving the Portuguese "complete commercial freedom", the right to establish Christian missions and build churches.

War with Lanna
In 1513, King Kaew of Lanna invaded Sukhothai. Ramathibodi II led the Siamese armies to crush the invading armies and proceeded further to Lanna heartlands. In 1515, he sacked Lampang (a Southeast Asian practice to sack but not to occupy). He then appointed his son, Prince Athittayawong as King of Sukhothai.

Establishment of Corvée system

In Southeast Asia, manpower was the source of other powers. In 1518, Ramathibodi II established the Siamese Corvée system, the very system that lasted until its abolition by Chulalongkorn in 1905. The Siamese commoners - called phrai - were subjected to lifelong labour service to the government. All Siamese men aged 18 would be registered to be conscripted - to be sent to war (Phrai Thaan) or public construction (Phrai luang). It was similar to modern form of conscription. However, the Siamese Corvée system existed in various forms. Krom Phra Suratsawadi, a department of the royal bureaucracy, oversaw conscription.

Death 

Ramathibodi II died in July/10 October 1529, during which a great comet appeared as  recorded in the Siamese Chronicles:

His son, Prince Athittayawong, succeeded to the throne as Borommaracha IV.

Ancestry

References
Notes

Written sources
 
 
 

1473 births
1529 deaths
Suphannaphum dynasty
Kings of Ayutthaya
15th-century monarchs in Asia
16th-century monarchs in Asia
Princes of Ayutthaya
16th-century Thai people
15th-century Thai people